Just Kwaou-Mathey  (born 4 December 1999) is a French athlete who competes in the 110m hurdles.

Career

Junior
The French junior 60m champion in 2019, Kwaou-Mather finished fifth in the final of the 2021 European Athletics U23 Championships – Men's 110 metres hurdles in Tallinn, Estonia running 13.59 seconds.

Senior
In June 2022, Kwaou-Mathey ran 13.30 in Geneva for the 110m hurdles to achieve the entry criteria for the upcoming 2022 World Athletics Championships. A week later in Paris, he lowered his personal best to 13.27 seconds. At the World Championships he qualified from the heats and in the semi-final ran a new personal best time of 13.25 in Eugene, Oregon, but missed out on a place in the final by 0.03  seconds.  He took this form into the 2022 European Athletics Championships and won the bronze medal, finishing third in the final in Munich in a time of 13.33. In March 2023 at the European Athletics Indoor Championships he won a bronze medal again, in the 60m hurdles.

Personal life
He is friends with footballer Dayot Upamecano and gave him tickets for the European Championships in Munich, where Upamecano plays football for Bayern Munich, and where Kwaou-Mathey won a bronze medal.

References

External links

1999 births
Living people
French male hurdlers
Athletes from Paris
European Athletics Championships medalists
20th-century French people
21st-century French people